Fanny Fleury (1846 – 1923) was a French painter.

Fleury was born in Paris, France, and trained with Emile Auguste Carolus-Duran, Marie Durand and Jean-Jacques Henner.
She showed works at the Paris Salon from 1869 to 1882, and received an honourable mention at the Exposition Universelle of 1889.
Her painting The Pathway to the Village Church was included in the 1905 book Women Painters of the World.
Fleury died in Paris.

Gallery

References

External links

 Fanny Laurent Fleury on artnet

1846 births
1923 deaths
Painters from Paris
French women painters
19th-century French painters
20th-century French painters
19th-century French women artists
20th-century French women artists